Complementarity-determining regions (CDRs) are part of the variable chains in immunoglobulins (antibodies) and T cell receptors, generated by B-cells and T-cells respectively, where these molecules bind to their specific antigen. A set of CDRs constitutes a paratope. As the most variable parts of the molecules, CDRs are crucial to the diversity of antigen specificities generated by lymphocytes.

Location and structure

There are three CDRs (CDR1, CDR2 and CDR3), arranged non-consecutively, on the amino acid sequence of a variable domain of an antigen receptor. Since the antigen receptors are typically composed of two variable domains (on two different polypeptide chains, heavy and light chain), there are six CDRs for each antigen receptor that can collectively come into contact with the antigen. A single antibody molecule has two antigen receptors and therefore contains twelve CDRs total. There are three CDR loops per variable domain in antibodies. Sixty CDRs can be found on a pentameric IgM molecule.

Since most sequence variation associated with immunoglobulins and T cell receptors are found in the CDRs, these regions are sometimes referred to as hypervariable regions. Within the variable domain, CDR1 and CDR2 are found in the variable (V) region of a polypeptide chain, and CDR3 includes some of V, all of diversity (D, heavy chains only) and joining (J) regions. CDR3 is the most variable.

The tertiary structure of an antibody is important to analyze and design new antibodies. The three-dimensional structures of the non-H3 CDRs of antibodies have been clustered and classified by Chothia et al. and more recently by North et al. Homology modeling is a computational method to build tertiary structures from amino-acid sequences. The so-called H3-rules are empirical rules to build models of CDR3.

See also
 Framework region
 Hypervariable region

References

External links
 
 PyIgClassify -- server for classification of CDR conformations

Amino acids
Antibodies
Immunology